Río Culebra may refer to:

 Río Culebra (Aguada, Puerto Rico)
 Río Culebra (Orocovis, Puerto Rico)
 Rio Culebra (Colorado), Costilla County, Colorado

See also
 Culebra (disambiguation)
 Culebrinas River